Roger Thomas Foley (May 25, 1886 – October 9, 1974) was a United States district judge of the United States District Court for the District of Nevada.

Education and career

Born in Sioux City, Iowa, Foley graduated from the University of Chicago Law School in 1910 and was in private practice in Goldfield, Nevada from 1911 to 1925, and in Los Angeles, California from 1925 to 1928. He was a district attorney for Goldfield from 1916 to 1924. He was a justice of the peace and municipal judge in Las Vegas, Nevada from 1929 to 1931. He was a deputy district attorney of Las Vegas from 1932 to 1934, then district attorney of Las Vegas from 1935 to 1938. He was a Nevada district judge for Clark County and Lincoln County from 1939 to 1941, returning to private practice in Las Vegas from 1941 to 1945.

Federal judicial service

Foley was nominated by President Franklin D. Roosevelt on March 30, 1945, to a seat on the United States District Court for the District of Nevada vacated by Judge Frank Herbert Norcross. He was confirmed by the United States Senate on April 10, 1945, and received his commission from President Harry S. Truman on May 2, 1945. He served as Chief Judge from 1954 to 1957. He assumed senior status on April 1, 1957. His service terminated on October 9, 1974, due to his death.

Family and honor

Foley's son, Roger D. Foley, also served as a federal judge on the same court. The Foley Federal Building and United States Courthouse in Las Vegas is named for the family, as a whole.

References

Sources
 

1886 births
1974 deaths
American justices of the peace
District attorneys in Nevada
Nevada state court judges
Municipal judges in the United States
Judges of the United States District Court for the District of Nevada
United States district court judges appointed by Franklin D. Roosevelt
People from Sioux City, Iowa
University of Chicago Law School alumni
20th-century American judges